Odina Aliyeva (born 22 May 1990) is an Uzbekistani-born Azerbaijani volleyball player who plays for Shenzhen Zhongsai and the Azerbaijani national volleyball team.

Personal life
Bayramova is married to Azerbaijani volleyball player Vugar Bayramov.

References

External links
 

1990 births
Living people
People from Navoiy Region
Uzbekistani emigrants to Azerbaijan
Uzbekistani women's volleyball players
Azerbaijani women's volleyball players
Expatriate volleyball players in Italy
Outside hitters
Azerbaijani expatriate sportspeople in Italy
Volleyball players at the 2015 European Games
European Games competitors for Azerbaijan
Azerbaijani expatriate sportspeople in China
Expatriate volleyball players in China
Azerbaijani expatriate sportspeople in Indonesia
Expatriate volleyball players in Indonesia
Azerbaijani expatriate sportspeople in the United States
Expatriate volleyball players in the United States